"Growing Up the Hard Way" is the fifth and final single taken from the album Agent Provocateur by the band Foreigner, and subsequently released only in Europe in September 1985. The song was written by Lou Gramm and Mick Jones, and the B-side, "She's Too Tough", a rockin' Elvis Presley-type song, is also featured on the American single release of "Reaction to Action".

References

1985 singles
Foreigner (band) songs
Songs written by Mick Jones (Foreigner)
Songs written by Lou Gramm
1984 songs
Atlantic Records singles
Song recordings produced by Alex Sadkin
Song recordings produced by Mick Jones (Foreigner)